On January 16, 2010, the United States Department of Defense complied with a court order and made public a heavily redacted list of the detainees held in the Bagram Theater Internment Facility.
Detainees were initially held in primitive, temporary quarters, in what was originally called the Bagram Collection Point, from late 2001.
Detainees were later moved to an indoor detention center until late 2009, when newly constructed facilities were opened.

The identity of most detainees held in Bagram remained classified until the publication of the first list in January 2010.

Dozens of the names on the list are identical to names of detainees who had been held in the Guantanamo Bay detention camps, in Cuba.
It was reported that three of the detainees in Bagram had formerly been held in Guantanamo, because they had the same Internment Serial Numbers.  They were: Gul Zaman, Khadan Kadri and Hafizullah Shabaz Khau.

While some Guantanamo detainees were sent directly to Guantanamo from CIA custody, most Guantanamo detainees spent some time in US Military custody at Bagram, or at the similar Kandahar detention facility.  Close to one hundred detainees testified about their time in Bagram during one of their OARDEC proceedings, or told reporters about their stay after their release.

Several dozen individuals reported being held in Bagram prior to the preparation of the official list published in January 2010.  A few individuals report being released from Bagram, who aren't on the official list because they arrived there are the official list was prepared.

Guantanamo detainees who reported spending time in Bagram

Individuals who reported being held in Bagram prior to the publication of the first official list

The official list of Bagram detainees, as of September 22, 2009

See also
Sayed Gulab
Pasta Khan
Raiz
Mahajir Ziarahman

References

External links

Human Rights First; Undue Process: An Examination of Detention and Trials of Bagram Detainees in Afghanistan in April 2009 (2009)

Bagram Theater Internment Facility detainees